María Isabel "Misa" Rodríguez Rivero (born 22 July 1999) is a Spanish professional footballer who plays as a goalkeeper for Liga F club Real Madrid CF and the Spain women's national team. She won the Zamora Trophy in 2020–21 season, conceding 0.93 goals per game.

Club career
Rodríguez joined newly-established Real Madrid Femenino at the beginning of 2020-21 season. In the same season, she won the Zamora trophy awarded to the goalkeeper with the lowest "goals-to-games" ratio in the Spanish league.

Honours

Club

Atletico de Madrid Feminino 

 Primera Division (women): 2016–2017, 2017–2018, 2018–2019

International

Spain U-19 

 U19 European Championship: 2018

Individual 

 Zamora Trophy: 2020–2021

References

External links
 
 Official profile in Real Madrid website
https://www.uefa.com/womensunder19/history/

Spanish women's footballers
Primera División (women) players
Real Madrid Femenino players
1999 births
Living people
Atlético Madrid Femenino players
Spain women's international footballers
Deportivo de La Coruña (women) players
Footballers from Las Palmas
Women's association football goalkeepers
UEFA Women's Euro 2022 players
Spain women's youth international footballers